Joanne Abbott (born 25 April 1955) is a Canadian sailor. She competed in the 1996 Summer Olympics.

References

1955 births
Living people
Canadian female sailors (sport)
North American Champions Soling
Olympic sailors of Canada
Sailors at the 1996 Summer Olympics – Soling
Sportspeople from Sarnia
Soling class world champions